Tsutomu Sato may refer to:

, Japanese politician
 Tsutomu Sato (ophthalmologist) (1902–1960), Japanese ophthalmologist
 Tsutomu Sato, commanding officer of Japanese battleship Fusō
, Japanese novelist
, Japanese windsurfer